Rochester Community Baseball, Inc. are the owners of the Triple-A Rochester Red Wings baseball team.

History
The company was formed when in 1956 the St. Louis Cardinals announced that they would no longer operate the franchise in Rochester. Local businessman Morrie Silver led a community stock drive to purchase the team and the stadium. Silver and 8,221 shareholders purchased the team from the Cardinals on February 27, 1957, and gained affiliation with the Baltimore Orioles in 1961. The event became known as the "72 Day Miracle". Local businesses such as Bausch & Lomb, Haloid, and Rochester Gas & Electric set up pledge booths in their offices as part of the drive.

Silver served as the team president and general manager, having purchased a $25,000 share of stock. His daughter Naomi Silver is the president, chief executive officer and chief operating officer. Gareth Larder is chairman of the board.

As of December 12, 2011, there were 215 shareholders within the team with equity stakes at 0.1% to 5.0% per person.  The stock is not publicly traded and has never paid a dividend.

References

Rochester Red Wings
1956 establishments in New York (state)